The 1949 Chatham Cup was the 22nd annual nationwide knockout football competition in New Zealand.

The competition was run on a regional basis, with regional associations each holding separate qualifying rounds. Teams taking part in the final rounds are known to have included: Eden AFC (Auckland), Hamilton Wanderers, Rotowaro Tigers (Waikato), Moturoa AFC (New Plymouth), Ohakea (Manawatu), Petone Settlers, Waterside (Wellington), Wigram, Technical Old Boys, Nomads (Christchurch), Northern AFC, Green Island FC (Dunedin), Stockton (West Coast) and Invercargill Thistle (Southland).

The 1949 final
The final was played in front of a then-record crowd of 12,000. Interest was high as the local Wellingtonian team was a lower ranked team (in the second division of Wellington football) who had gained a reputation as giant-killers. They went on to win the final 1-0 after having beaten several higher ranked sides in the course of the tournament, including a narrow win over Waterside and a heavy 7-1 thrashing of Wellington Marist. The final is memorable for the magic of the giant-killing performance, which caught the imagination of the local population. The only goal of the match came in the second half, when Northern keeper Jim Stephenson parried a David McKissock shot directly into the path of Petone forward Wally Hewitt who duly scored. Petone survived a late scare when keeper Ben Savage was required to save a penalty, and the Settlers of Petone held on to win by the solitary goal.

Results

North Island Semi-Finals

South Island Semi-Finals

Match abandoned after 2 hours and 10 minutes of play due to bad light.

References

Rec.Sport.Soccer Statistics Foundation New Zealand 1949 page

Chatham Cup
Chatham Cup
Chatham Cup